The rufous-vented niltava (Niltava sumatrana) is a species of bird in the family Muscicapidae.
It is found in Sumatra and the Malay Peninsula.
Its natural habitat is subtropical or tropical moist montane forests.

References

rufous-vented niltava
Birds of the Malay Peninsula
Birds of Sumatra
rufous-vented niltava
Taxonomy articles created by Polbot